Penek Sitnumnoi (เป็นเอก ศีษย์หนุ่มน้อย) is a Thai Muay Thai fighter. He is now a trainer at Evolve MMA in Singapore.

Titles and accomplishments
Lumpinee Stadium
 2011 Lumpinee Stadium 126 lbs Champion
Channel 7 Stadium
 2011 Channel 7 Boxing Stadium 130 lbs Champion
World Professional Muaythai Federation
 2013 WPMF World 130 lbs Champion
Siam Omnoi Stadium
 2010 Siam Omnoi Boxing Stadium 126 lbs Champion

Awards
 2011 Sports Writers Association of Thailand Fighter of the Year

Fight record

|-  style="background:#fbb;"
| 2014-12-09 || Loss||align=left| Muangthai PKSaenchaimuaythaigym    || Lumpinee Stadium || Bangkok, Thailand || Decision|| 5 || 3:00
|-  style="background:#cfc;"
| 2014-10-25|| Win ||align=left| Mark Saraccino || Patong Boxing Stadium ||  Phuket, Thailand || TKO || 4 ||
|-  style="background:#fbb;"
| 2014-08-08 || Loss||align=left| Kongsak Saenchaimuaythaigym || Lumpinee Stadium || Bangkok, Thailand || Decision || 5 || 3:00
|-  style="background:#fbb;"
| 2014-06-06|| Loss||align=left| Kongsak Saenchaimuaythaigym || Lumpinee Stadium || Bangkok, Thailand || Decision || 5 || 3:00
|-  style="background:#fbb;"
| 2013-11-08|| Loss||align=left| Saeksan Or. Kwanmuang || Lumpinee Stadium || Bangkok, Thailand || KO (Overhand Right)|| 2 || 1:40
|-  style="background:#fbb;"
| 2013-08-05|| Loss||align=left| Pakorn PKSaenchaimuaythaigym || Rajadamnern Stadium || Bangkok, Thailand || Decision || 5 || 3:00
|-  style="background:#fbb;"
| 2013-07-09|| Loss ||align=left| Superbank Mor Ratanabandit || Lumpinee Stadium || Bangkok, Thailand || Decision || 5 || 3:00 
|-
! style=background:white colspan=9 |
|-  style="background:#cfc;"
| 2013-06-03 || Win||align=left| Pakorn PKSaenchaimuaythaigym || Rajadamnern Stadium || Bangkok, Thailand || Decision || 5 || 3:00
|-  style="background:#cfc;"
| 2013-05-17|| Win ||align=left| Amine Kacem || Impacts Fight Night 3 ||  France || Decision || 5 || 3:00
|-  style="background:#cfc;"
| 2013-03-30 || Win||align=left| Pokaew Fonjangchonburi ||  || Koh Samui, Thailand || Decision || 5 || 3:00
|-
! style=background:white colspan=9 |
|-  style="background:#cfc;"
| 2012-12-07 || Win ||align=left| Petpanomrung Kiatmuu9    || Lumpinee Stadium || Bangkok, Thailand || Decision || 5 || 3:00
|-
! style=background:white colspan=9 |
|-  style="background:#fbb;"
| 2012-07-07 ||Loss||align=left| Sagetdao Petpayathai || || Phatthalung, Thailand || Decision || 5 || 3:00 
|-
! style=background:white colspan=9 |
|-  style="background:#fbb;"
| 2012-06-08 || Loss||align=left| Saenchai || Lumpinee Champion Krikkrai Fight || Bangkok, Thailand || Decision || 5 || 3:00
|-  style="background:#cfc;"
| 2012-05-04 || Win ||align=left| Sam-A Gaiyanghadao || Lumpinee Stadium || Bangkok, Thailand || Decision || 5 || 3:00
|-
! style=background:white colspan=9 |
|-  style="background:#cfc;"
| 2012-03-09 || Win ||align=left|  Wanchalerm Chor.Cheankamon || Lumpinee Stadium || Bangkok, Thailand || KO (Elbow)|| 4 || 
|-
! style=background:white colspan=9 |
|-  style="background:#cfc;"
| 2012-01-17|| Win ||align=left| Saeksan Or. Kwanmuang || Lumpinee Stadium || Bangkok, Thailand || Decision || 5 || 3:00

|-  style="background:#cfc;"
| 2011-|| Win ||align=left| Sittisak Petpayathai ||  || Songkhla province, Thailand || TKO || 3 || 

|-  style="background:#cfc;"
| 2011-10-09|| Win ||align=left| Sittisak Petpayathai || Channel 7 Boxing Stadium || Bangkok, Thailand || Decision || 5 || 3:00
|-
! style=background:white colspan=9 |
|-  style="background:#cfc;"
| 2011-09-06 || Win ||align=left| Mongkolchai Kwaitonggym || Lumpinee Stadium || Bangkok, Thailand || Decision|| 5 || 3:00 
|-
! style=background:white colspan=9 |

|-  style="background:#cfc;"
| 2011-08-09 || Win ||align=left| Saenkeng Jor.Noparat || Lumpinee Stadium || Bangkok, Thailand || Decision|| 5 || 3:00

|-  style="background:#cfc;"
| 2011- || Win ||align=left| Fahmai Skindiewgym ||  || Phatthalung province, Thailand || Decision|| 5 || 3:00

|-  style="background:#cfc;"
| 2011-05-27 || Win ||align=left| Pokaew Fonjangchonburi || Lumpinee Stadium || Thailand || Decision|| 5 || 3:00

|-  style="background:#c5d2ea;"
| 2011- || Draw||align=left| Saenkeng Jor.Noparat ||  Lumpinee Stadium|| Bangkok, Thailand || Decision|| 5 || 3:00

|-  style="background:#cfc;"
| 2011-04-06|| Win ||align=left| Denkiri Sor.Sommai||  || Songkhla, Thailand || KO (Right Elbow)  ||  ||
|-  style="background:#cfc;"
| 2011-03-20|| Win ||align=left| Saenghiran Lookbanyai ||  || Thailand || Decision|| 5 || 3:00
|-  style="background:#cfc;"
| 2011-01-25|| Win ||align=left| Sittisak Petpayathai || Lumpinee Stadium || Bangkok, Thailand || Decision|| 5 || 3:00
|-  style="background:#cfc;"
| 2010-10-23|| Win ||align=left|  Sittisak Petpayathai || Bangla Stadium ||  Phuket, Thailand || Decision || 5 || 3:00
|-  style="background:#cfc;"
| 2010-06-19|| Win ||align=left| Phet-Ek Kiatyongyut || Siam Omnoi Boxing Stadium ||  Thailand || Decision || 5 || 3:00
|-
! style=background:white colspan=9 |
|-  style="background:#cfc;"
| 2010-04-27 ||Win||align=left| Sittisak Petpayathai || Lumpinee Stadium || Bangkok, Thailand || Decision || 5 || 3:00
|-  style="background:#cfc;"
| 2010-03-19 ||Win||align=left| Sanghirun Lukbanyai || Lumpinee Stadium || Bangkok, Thailand || Decision || 5 || 3:00
|-  style="background:#cfc;"
| 2010-02-19 ||Win||align=left| Anantachai Lukbanyai || Lumpinee Stadium || Bangkok, Thailand || Decision || 5 || 3:00
|-  style="background:#fbb;"
| 2010-01-28 ||Loss||align=left| Anantachai Lukbanyai || Rajadamnern Stadium || Bangkok, Thailand || Decision || 5 || 3:00
|-  style="background:#fbb;"
| 2009-12-01 ||Loss||align=left| Rittidet Wor.Wantawee || Lumpinee Stadium || Bangkok, Thailand || Decision || 5 || 3:00
|-  style="background:#c5d2ea;"
| 2009-10-27|| Draw||align=left| Pinsiam Sor.Amnuaysirichoke || Lumpinee Stadium || Bangkok, Thailand || Decision|| 5 || 3:00
|-  style="background:#fbb;"
| 2009-08-31 ||Loss||align=left| Yosuper Peanratana || Rajadamnern Stadium || Bangkok, Thailand || Decision || 5 || 3:00
|-  style="background:#cfc;"
| 2009-05-05 || Win ||align=left| Rungrat Nathreekun || Lumpinee Stadium|| Bangkok, Thailand || Decision || 5 || 3:00
|-  style="background:#cfc;"
| 2009-04-07 || Win ||align=left| Pinsiam Sor.Amnuaysirichoke || Lumpinee Stadium|| Bangkok, Thailand || Decision || 5 || 3:00
|-  style="background:#cfc;"
| 2009-01-13 || Win ||align=left|  Rungrat Por.Thanaporn|| Lumpinee Stadium|| Bangkok, Thailand || Decision || 5 || 3:00
|-  style="background:#fbb;"
| 2008-09-23 ||Loss||align=left| Rungrat Nathreekun || Lumpinee Stadium || Bangkok, Thailand || Decision || 5 || 3:00
|-  style="background:#fbb;"
| 2008-08-08 ||Loss||align=left| Sam-A Gaiyanghadao || Lumpinee Stadium || Bangkok, Thailand || KO (Elbow || 4 ||
|-  style="background:#cfc;"
| 2008-04-25 ||Win||align=left|  Rakkiat Kiatpraphat || Rajadamnern Stadium || Bangkok, Thailand || Decision || 5 || 3:00
|-  style="background:#cfc;"
| 2008-03-25 ||Win||align=left|  Denchiangkwan Lamthongkarnpat	 || Lumpinee Stadium || Bangkok, Thailand || Decision || 5 || 3:00
|-  style="background:#;"
| 2008-02- ||||align=left|  Kaodeng Surpichitfarm ||  || Hat Yai, Thailand ||  || ||
|-  style="background:#cfc;"
| 2007-05-11 ||Win||align=left|  Muangsee Pumpanmuang	 || Lumpinee Stadium || Bangkok, Thailand || Decision || 5 || 3:00
|-  style="background:#cfc;"
| 2007-03-27 ||Win||align=left|  Inseekhao Pumpanmuang || Lumpinee Stadium || Bangkok, Thailand || Decision || 5 || 3:00
|-  style="background:#fbb;"
| 2007-01-26 ||Loss||align=left| Pueangnoi Phetsupapan || Lumpinee Stadium || Bangkok, Thailand || Decision || 5 || 3:00
|-  style="background:#fbb;"
| 2006-10-13 ||Loss||align=left| Punglek Phetsupapan	|| Lumpinee Stadium || Bangkok, Thailand || Decision || 5 || 3:00
|-  style="background:#cfc;"
| 2006-04-04 ||Win||align=left|  Amnuaydeat Teded99	 || Lumpinee Stadium || Bangkok, Thailand || Decision || 5 || 3:00
|-  style="background:#cfc;"
| 2006-03-07 ||Win||align=left|  Pannarong  Sakchaichote|| Lumpinee Stadium || Bangkok, Thailand || Decision || 5 || 3:00
|-  style="background:#fbb;"
| 2005-02-08 ||Loss||align=left| Sudpatapi Deatrat|| Lumpinee Stadium || Bangkok, Thailand || Decision || 5 || 3:00
|-
| colspan=9 | Legend:

References

Penek Sitnumnoi
Living people
1989 births
Penek Sitnumnoi